Lamia bidens is a nomen dubium species of beetle in the family Cerambycidae. It was described by Johan Christian Fabricius in 1775. It is described from Australia.

References

Lamiinae
Beetles described in 1775
Taxa named by Johan Christian Fabricius